California's 33rd congressional district is a congressional district in the U.S. state of California.

From January 3, 2023, following the 2020 redistricting cycle, the district centered on San Bernardino.

Competitiveness

In statewide races

Composition

As of the 2020 redistricting, California's 33rd congressional district is located in Southern California. The district takes up a part of southwestern San Bernardino County.

San Bernardino County is split between this district and the 23rd, 28th and 35th districts. The 33rd, 23rd and 28th districts are partitioned by Carnelian St, Highway 30, Amethyst Ave, Highland Ave, Foothill Freeway, Day Creek Blvd, Vintage Dr, Saddle Tree Pl, Day Creek Channel, Wardman Bullock Rd, Dawnridge Dr, Summit Ave, 14509 Saddlepeak Dr-14560 Labrador Ave, Ontario Freeway, Union Pacific Railroad, Highway 15, Highway 215, W Meyers Rd, Ohio Ave, Pine Ave, Bailey act, Highway 206, Devils Canyon Rd, Cloudland Truck Trail, Cloudland Cutoff, Hill Dr, W 54th St, E Hill Dr, Bonita Vista Dr, Sterling Ave, Argyle Ave, E Marshall Blvd, Rockford Ave, Lynwood Dr, La Praix St, Orchid Dr, Denair Ave, Highland Ave, Orchard Rd, Arroyo Vista Dr, Church St, Greensport Rd, Florida St, Garnet St, Nice Ave, Crafton Ave, 5th Ave, Walnut St, 6th Ave, S Wabash Ave, E Citrus Ave, N Church St, Southern California Regional Rail A, Tennessee St, Highway 10, California St, E Washington St, and S Barton Rd. 

The 33rd and 35th districts are partitioned by San Bernardino Rd, Orangewood Dr, Estacia St, Lion St, Highway 66, Helms Ave, Hampshire St, Archibald Ave, N Maple Ave, S Maple Ave, Randall Ave, Alder Ave, Union Pacific Railroad, Slover Ave, Tamarind Ave, Jurupa Ave, 11th St, and Locust Ave. The 33rd district takes in San Bernardino, Bloomington, Highland, Colton, Grand Terrace, Rialto and central Rancho Cucamonga, as well as the census-designated places Bloomington and Muscoy.

Cities and CDPs with 10,000 or more people
 San Bernardino: 222,101
 Rancho Cucamonga: 174,453
 Rialto: 104,026
 Highland: 55,417
 Colton: 53,909
 Bloomington: 24,339
 Grand Terrace: 13,150
 Muscoy: 11,546

List of members representing the district

Election results

1962

1964

1966

1968

1970

1972

1974

1976

1978

1980

1982

1984

1986

1988

1990

1992

1994

1996

1998

2000

2002

2004

2006

2008

2010

2012

2014

2016

2018

2020

2022

Historical district boundaries
From 2003 to 2013, the district encompassed the incorporated city of Culver City (a center of film and TV production), and in the Baldwin Hills unincorporated areas such as Ladera Heights, and some of the western neighborhoods within the city of Los Angeles such as Baldwin Hills (neighborhood).

From 1993 to 2013, large parts of the 33rd were in the California's 36th congressional district. The 36th was located in southwestern Los Angeles County, and included Manhattan Beach, Torrance, and portions of Los Angeles itself. This district was largely dismantled after the 2010 census, with the 33rd succeeding the 36th, while the current 36th is largely the successor of the old 45th district.

See also

List of United States congressional districts

References

Further reading

External links
 GovTrack.us: Current map of California's 33rd congressional district
GovTrack.us: Representative Henry Waxman
RAND California Election Returns: District Definitions

33
Government of Los Angeles County, California
Government of Los Angeles
Agoura Hills, California
Bel Air, Los Angeles
Beverly Hills, California
Brentwood, Los Angeles
Calabasas, California
El Segundo, California
Fairfax, Los Angeles
Hermosa Beach, California
Holmby Hills, Los Angeles
Koreatown, Los Angeles
Malibu, California
Manhattan Beach, California
Marina del Rey, California
Pacific Palisades, Los Angeles
Palos Verdes Peninsula
Playa del Rey, Los Angeles
Redondo Beach, California
Santa Monica, California
Santa Monica Mountains
Topanga, California
University of California, Los Angeles
Venice, Los Angeles
West Los Angeles
Westwood, Los Angeles
Westside (Los Angeles County)
Constituencies established in 1963
1963 establishments in California